Centinela may refer to:

 El Centinela (Baja California), a mountain west of Mexicali, Baja California, Mexico
 La Centinela, an archaeological site in the Chincha Valley of Peru
 Centinela Avenue, major street in the Westside region of Los Angeles County, California
 Centinela Creek, Los Angeles County, California
 Centinela Springs, a historic artesian spring 
 El Centinela, the Spanish-language version of the Catholic Sentinel
 California State Prison, Centinela

See also
 
 Sentinel (disambiguation)
 Centel, a former American telecommunications company